Centreville is a ghost town in Henderson County, located in the U.S. state of Texas. It was the county seat from 1848 to 1850.

Geography
The ghost town is located in the eastern shore of the Cedar Creek Reservoir, on the Texas State Highway 334, between Eustace and Gun Barrel City. It lies in an area of recent urban development.

References

Geography of Henderson County, Texas
Ghost towns in East Texas